Douglas Road, also West 37th Avenue on the greater Miami grid plan and Northwest 88th Avenue in Miramar, is a  north–south thoroughfare running west of downtown Miami in Miami-Dade County and Broward County, Florida. It changes names and becomes Pine Island Road, at the intersection with Sheridan Street (SR 822).

Route description
Douglas Road begins as South Douglas Road at Edgewater Drive in Coral Gables, immediately west of the city of Miami in Coconut Grove, headed north toward South Dixie Highway (US 1). Soon after crossing US 1, it crosses Bird Road (SR 976), straddling Miami and Coral Gables. Going northward, it crosses Coral Way (SR 972) and the Tamiami Trail (US 41) before crossing Miami grid baseline Flagler Street (SR 968) and becoming North Douglas Road.

West 37th Avenue/Douglas continues northward, crossing a Miami River fork before ending at Northwest 28th Street and South River Drive on the south bank of the Miami River. It begins again on the northern banks of the Miami River at Northwest North River Drive to North 79th Street (SR 934). North of 79th Street, it partially becomes a limited-access road running through railway trackage used by Amtrak and SFRTA, ending at North 95th Street.

The road begins briefly again in a small segment between North 103 Street and North 106 Street, just east of Hialeah.

Just north of LeJeune Road-Douglas Road Expressway and Ali Baba Avenue in Opa-locka, it begins again as Douglas/West 37th Avenue as a through north–south road and bordering Opa-locka Airport to the west briefly, north into Miramar in Broward County.

The road continues north to Sheridan Street (SR 822) and changes names from Douglas Road to Pine Island Road where it has an interchange with I-595 and enters Plantation, where it intersects Broward Blvd (SR 842). It then continues north to Coral Springs, where it changes names again to Coral Springs Drive, where it passes through the city. It changes its name back to Pine Island Road when it crosses under the Sawgrass Expressway (SR 869), where it ends in Parkland at SR/CR 827.

History
Forming the eastern boundary of Coral Gables, George Merrick used the frontage of the home of John Douglas as the north–south road junction into the city from Coral Way in September 1923.

See also
Douglas Entrance
Douglas Road (Metrorail station)

References

Coral Gables, Florida
Roads in Miami
Roads in Miami-Dade County, Florida
Roads in Broward County, Florida
Miramar, Florida